Jimmy Connors was the defending champion, but did not participate this year.

Andrei Chesnokov won the tournament, beating Amos Mansdorf in the final, 6–4, 6–3.

Seeds

  Andrei Chesnokov (champion)
  Amos Mansdorf (final)
  Christo van Rensburg (quarterfinals)
  Mark Koevermans (quarterfinals)
  Gilad Bloom (semifinals)
  Tomás Carbonell (second round)
 N/A
  David Engel (second round)

Draw

Finals

Top half

Bottom half

References

 Main Draw

Tel Aviv Open
1990 Riklis Classic